Thomas Letsch (born 26 August 1968) is a German professional football manager who is the manager of VfL Bochum.

Managerial career
Letsch was never a professional footballer and started his coaching career at VfB Oberesslingen/Zell as player-manager. In July 2001, he became manager of Stuttgarter Kickers's reserve team until 2002, but was also a part of the first team staff until the end of the 2002–03 season. He then moved to FC Union Heilbronn and was the manager for one season. From January 2005 until July 2007, he was the assistant manager of SSV Ulm 1846. From January 2008 to June 2009, he was the manager of SG Sonnenhof Großaspach.

In July 2012 he went to Salzburg where managed the under-16 team of FC Red Bull Salzburg. Two months later, he was also appointed as football director of academy. In the following season, he was promoted to first team assistant manager. From July 2014, he was manager for the under-18 squad. During his time with the under-18s, he was also the assistant coach for FC Red Bull Salzburg. In December 2015, after the firing of Peter Zeidler, he was for two matches head coach of Salzburg. In the 2015–16 season, he also managed the team of FC Red Bull Salzburg in the UEFA Youth League. Following Zeidler, he became manager of FC Liefering in June 2015.

On 18 June 2017, Erzgebirge Aue appointed Letsch as their new manager, replacing the Schalke 04-bound Domenico Tedesco on a three-year contract. However, after just three games, Aue sacked Letsch due to the club's poor form and results.

On 27 February 2018, he was appointed Austria Wien manager until the end of 2017–18 season, replacing Thorsten Fink. He was sacked on 11 March 2019.

On 26 May 2020, he was announced as the new manager of Vitesse Arnhem after club icon Edward Sturing. Letsch made a good start to the 2020–21 season. The club went on to secure  fourth place in the Eredivisie, reached the final of the Dutch Cup (which was lost 2–1 to AFC Ajax) and ensuring qualification for the UEFA Europa Conference League. In September 2022, he left Arnhem and moved to VfL Bochum.

References

External links

1968 births
Living people
German football managers
FC Red Bull Salzburg managers
FC Liefering managers
FC Erzgebirge Aue managers
2. Bundesliga managers
SG Sonnenhof Großaspach managers
FK Austria Wien managers
Austrian Football Bundesliga managers
SBV Vitesse managers
Eredivisie managers
VfL Bochum managers
Bundesliga managers
Expatriate football managers in Austria
Expatriate football managers in the Netherlands
German expatriate sportspeople in Austria
German expatriate sportspeople in the Netherlands
People from Esslingen am Neckar
Sportspeople from Stuttgart (region)